The Texas State Soil and Water Conservation Board (TSSWCB) is a state agency of Texas, headquartered in Temple. The agency enforces the state's soil and water conservation laws and coordinates conservation and nonpoint source pollution abatement programs. The Texas State Legislature created the agency in 1939.

See also

Environmental law

References

External links
 Texas State Soil and Water Conservation Board

State agencies of Texas
Water conservation in the United States
Soil in the United States
Water pollution in the United States
Water in Texas
Water management authorities in the United States